Westphalia is a city in Shelby County, Iowa, United States. The population was 126 at the time of the 2020 census.

History
Westphalia was founded in 1872 as a colony of German Catholics. It was named after the region of Westphalia, in Germany.

Geography
Westphalia is located at  (41.719351, -95.394576).

Demographics

2010 census
At the 2010 census there were 127 people in 59 households, including 36 families, in the city. The racial makup of the city was 100.0% White. Hispanic or Latino of any race were 3.9%.

Of the 59 households 25.4% had children under the age of 18 living with them, 50.8% were married couples living together, 8.5% had a female householder with no husband present, 1.7% had a male householder with no wife present, and 39.0% were non-families. 39.0% of households were one person and 15.3% were one person aged 65 or older. The average household size was 2.15 and the average family size was 2.89.

The median age was 45.5 years. 20.5% of residents were under the age of 18; 8.6% were between the ages of 18 and 24; 20.4% were from 25 to 44; 33% were from 45 to 64; and 17.3% were 65 or older. The gender makeup of the city was 50.4% male and 49.6% female.

2000 census
At the 2000 census there were 160 people in 61 households, including 43 families, in the city. The racial makup of the city was 100.00% White.
Of the 61 households 37.7% had children under the age of 18 living with them, 62.3% were married couples living together, 3.3% had a female householder with no husband present, and 29.5% were non-families. 26.2% of households were one person and 18.0% were one person aged 65 or older. The average household size was 2.62 and the average family size was 3.26.

The age distribution was 30.6% under the age of 18, 5.0% from 18 to 24, 33.8% from 25 to 44, 13.8% from 45 to 64, and 16.9% 65 or older. The median age was 37 years. For every 100 females, there were 86.0 males. For every 100 females age 18 and over, there were 88.1 males.

The median household income was $35,938 and the median family income  was $47,500. Males had a median income of $35,833 versus $20,417 for females. The per capita income for the city was $17,066. About 7.9% of families and 11.2% of the population were below the poverty line, including 18.6% of those under the age of eighteen and 16.7% of those sixty five or over.

Education
The Harlan Community School District operates local public schools.  The district serves the towns of Harlan, Defiance, Earling, Panama, Portsmouth and Westphalia, the unincorporated communities of Jacksonville and Corley, and the surrounding rural areas.

See also
St. Boniface Catholic Church (Westphalia, Iowa), listed on the National Register of Historic Places.

References

External links
 City website

Cities in Shelby County, Iowa
Cities in Iowa